State Highway 204 (SH 204) is a Texas state highway running from Jacksonville southeast to US 259 north of Nacogdoches.  This route was designated on May 15, 1934 replacing the east leg of SH 110 from US 259 north of Nacogdoches to SH 110. On October 31, 1958, SH 204 was extended west to its current end in Jacksonville.

Route description
SH 204 begins at a junction with US 79 in Jacksonville.  It heads southeast from this junction through Jacksonville to an intersection with Loop 456.  The highway continues to the southeast through the northern outskirts of Gallatin to an intersection with SH 110 in Ponta.  Heading towards the southeast, the highway continues to a junction with Loop 142.  The highway continues to the southeast to an intersection with FM 2274.  It continues to the southeast to a junction with FM 235.  As the highway continues to the southeast, it intersects US 84 in Reklaw.  It heads southeast from this junction to an intersection with FM 1648.  The highway continues to the southeast to an intersection with FM 225 in Cushing.  Heading towards the southeast, the highway continues to a junction with FM 2783.  SH 204 reaches its eastern terminus at US 259.

Junction list

References

Transportation in Cherokee County, Texas
Transportation in Nacogdoches County, Texas
204